Olivier Hatem (born 16 January 1973) is a French Paralympic archer from La Tronche, France.

In archery at the 2000 Summer Paralympics, he won two silver medals. He also competed in the 2004, 2008, and 2016 Summer Paralympics.

References

External links 
 
 

1973 births
Living people
French male archers
Paralympic archers of France
Paralympic silver medalists for France
Paralympic medalists in archery
Archers at the 2000 Summer Paralympics
Archers at the 2004 Summer Paralympics
Archers at the 2008 Summer Paralympics
Archers at the 2016 Summer Paralympics
Medalists at the 2000 Summer Paralympics
Sportspeople from La Tronche
21st-century French people